Colparion madgei is an extinct species of hive snail endemic to Mauritius.

References

Colparion
Extinct gastropods
Gastropods described in 1938
Extinct animals of Africa
Taxonomy articles created by Polbot
Endemic fauna of Mauritius